Sucker catfish may refer to:

 Members of Loricariidae, a family of catfishes with a suckermouth
 Members of Sisoridae, a family of catfishes that may have an adhesive apparatus on their thorax or on paired fins

See also
 Suckerfish (disambiguation)
 Catfish (disambiguation)

Siluriformes